The Agua Caliente Open was a golf tournament on the PGA Tour first played in 1930 in Tijuana, Mexico. The inaugural event, which was won by Gene Sarazen, offered the largest purse to date — $25,000 with a $10,000 winner's share. The tournament had a second incarnation briefly in the 1950s with the last two events played under the name Tijuana Open Invitational.

Winners

References

Former PGA Tour events
Golf tournaments in Mexico
Golf in Tijuana